In geometry, the inverse Pythagorean theorem (also known as the reciprocal Pythagorean theorem or the upside down Pythagorean theorem) is as follows:

Let A, B be the endpoints of the hypotenuse of a right triangle ABC. Let D be the foot of a perpendicular dropped from C, the vertex of the right angle, to the hypotenuse. Then

This theorem should not be confused with proposition 48 in book 1 of Euclid's Elements, the converse of the Pythagorean theorem, which states that if the square on one side of a triangle is equal to the sum of the squares on the other two sides then the other two sides contain a right angle.

Proof 

The area of triangle ABC can be expressed in terms of either AC and BC, or AB and CD:

given CD > 0, AC > 0 and BC > 0.

Using the Pythagorean theorem,

as above.

Special case of the cruciform curve
The cruciform curve or cross curve is a quartic plane curve given by the equation

where the two parameters determining the shape of the curve, a and b are each CD.

Substituting x with AC and y with BC gives

Inverse-Pythagorean triples can be generated using integer parameters t and u as follows.

Application

If two identical lamps are placed at A and B, the theorem and the inverse-square law imply that the amount of light received at C is the same as when a single lamp is placed at D.

See also

References 

Geometry